The Anglican Church of St Roch at Pendomer in Closworth, Somerset, England was built in the 14th century. It is a Grade II* listed building.

History

The church, dedicated to Saint Roch, was built in the 14th century, although 1297 has been suggested.  It was modified in the 15th.

The parish is part of the Coker Ridge benefice within the Diocese of Bath and Wells.

Architecture

The stone building has hamstone dressings and clay tile roofs. It has a single-cell plan with a two-stage west tower with a parapet.

The interior includes a memorial dating from 1328 and an effigy of a knight believed to be John de Domer. There are remains of 15th century stained glass in some of the windows.

See also  
 List of ecclesiastical parishes in the Diocese of Bath and Wells

References

Grade II* listed buildings in South Somerset
Grade II* listed churches in Somerset
Church of England church buildings in South Somerset